The Pepsi Chart (later known as Pepsi Live) was a music show on Network Ten that consisted of live performances both from Sydney, Australia and London, United Kingdom. Each show would end up with a look at the top 10 singles in Australia.

Originally it was hosted by Tory Mussett and afterwards Dylan Lewis took over presenting duties.

See also

 List of Australian music television shows

Network 10 original programming
Australian music television series
2000 Australian television series debuts
2003 Australian television series endings